Croix is a commune in the Nord department in northern France.

The headquarters of Auchan, a hypermarket chain, are located in Croix.

Population

Heraldry

See also
 Villa Cavrois
Communes of the Nord department

References

External links 
 
  

Communes of Nord (French department)
French Flanders